Urban Gothic was a horror based series of short stories shown on Channel 5 running for two series between May 2000 and December 2001. Filmed on a low budget and broadcast in a later time-slot, it nonetheless acquired a following. It has also since been repeated on the Horror Channel.

Set around London there is an underlying story thread that only becomes clear in the last episodes of each series. Each episode was different in style from the others, running the gamut of documentary-style independent film to spoof, to slick dramas similar in style to The Outer Limits or The Twilight Zone.

Episodes

Series 1 (2000)

Series 2 (2001)

External links

2000s British horror television series
2000 British television series debuts
2001 British television series endings
2000s British anthology television series
Channel 5 (British TV channel) original programming
British horror fiction television series
British fantasy television series